The Berner Schilling (or Amtliche Chronik, also Grosse Burgunderchronik, Great Burgundy chronicle) is a chronicle of Diebold Schilling the Elder of Berne (1480s), covering the history of the Old Swiss Confederacy up to the Burgundian Wars.

See also 
 Swiss illustrated chronicles

External links

Facsimile

Swiss illustrated chronicles
Schilling
1480s books